The 1884 United States presidential election in Georgia took place on November 4, 1884, as part of the wider United States presidential election. Voters chose twelve representatives, or electors, to the Electoral College, who voted for president and vice president.

Background and vote
Following Reconstruction, Georgia would be the first former Confederate state to substantially disenfranchise its newly enfranchised freedmen and many poor whites, doing so in the early 1870s. This largely limited the Republican Party to a few North Georgia counties with substantial Civil War Unionist sentiment – chiefly Fannin but also to a lesser extent Pickens, Gilmer and Towns – and in presidential elections to a small number of counties elsewhere where blacks were not fully disenfranchised. The Democratic Party served as the guardian of white supremacy against a Republican Party historically associated with memories of Reconstruction, and the main competition became Democratic primaries, which were restricted to whites on the grounds of the Democratic Party being legally a private club. This restriction was done by local county laws, but combined with the highly efficacious cumulative poll tax introduced in 1877 meant that turnout declined steadily throughout the 1880s, unlike any other former Confederate state except South Carolina.

Despite economic problems in the mountain counties due to deflation produced by the gold standard and large-scale government spending reductions by the “Redeemer” Democrats, voter turnout, especially for opposition parties, would maintain its poll tax-driven decline until the Populist movement, which did not begin until five years after the 1884 election. Consequently, Cleveland and Hendricks were able to stabilise the decline from 1880, again carrying Georgia by almost a two-to-one margin.

Results

Results by county

Notes

References

Georgia
1884
1884 Georgia (U.S. state) elections